Police in Pollywood is a 2014 Indian Punjabi-language romantic comedy film directed by Sunita Dhir, produced by Rajinder Gautam and Monika Gautam and starring Anuj Sachdeva, Bhagwant Mann, Raj Brar and Sardool Sikander.

Reception
The film mostly received negative reviews. Jesse Brar of PunjabiReviews.com lashed out at the film and said "this is not even a film, its something some people have put up together".

Cast
 Anuj Sachdeva 
 Bhagwant Mann
 Raj Brar 
 Sardool Sikander 
 Mani Kapoor 
 Parmod Mautho 
 Sunita Dhir
 Baljinder Singh Atwal
 Preeto
 Surinder Bath
 Anita Meet
 Jagdeep Jaggi 
 Raghveer Boli
 Samuel John

References

External links 
 

2014 films
Indian romantic comedy films
2014 romantic comedy films
Punjabi-language Indian films
2010s Punjabi-language films